Michael David Strachan (born May 24, 1953) is a former professional American football running back in the National Football League (NFL).

Strachan played for Jackson High School in Miami, FL and went to college at Iowa State University in Ames, Iowa (1972-1974) on an athletic scholarship. He was named All Big 8 three times while a member of the Iowa State Cyclones.  

Mike Strachan was drafted by the New Orleans Saints in the 9th round of the 1975 NFL Draft. He played six seasons for the Saints and was affectionately known as "The Hound." He led the Saints in rushing during his rookie season. 

After his release by the Saints at the end of the 1980 season, he attempted to begin a career in real estate but that was cut short due to legal troubles. In 1982, Strachan was convicted of drug trafficking and sentenced to 3 years in federal prison after “about 10” Saints players including his former teammates Chuck Muncie and Dave Waymer, as well as two Saints who were drafted in 1981, George Rogers and Frank Warren, went before a grand jury and agreed to testify against Strachan in exchange for their immunity from prosecution.  He served eighteen months of his sentence at Maxwell Air Force Base and was paroled early.

Mike Strachan and his wife still live in the New Orleans area and he continues to work in real estate sales with RE/MAX. During an interview by WHNO Sports in 2012, he stated that he was a part owner of a couture furniture and art gallery on Dauphine Street in New Orleans called “Exagere” but it has since closed.

External links

 SportsNOLAtv interview:
https://m.youtube.com/watch?v=q7xiXVm_bVc

References

1953 births
Living people
American football running backs
Iowa State Cyclones football players
New Orleans Saints players
Players of American football from Miami
Miami Jackson Senior High School alumni